County Bridge No. 124 is a historic stone arch bridge located in Caln Township, Chester County, Pennsylvania. It spans Beaver Creek. The bridge was constructed in 1916 of squared ashlar.

It was listed on the National Register of Historic Places in 1988.

References 

Road bridges on the National Register of Historic Places in Pennsylvania
Bridges completed in 1916
Bridges in Chester County, Pennsylvania
National Register of Historic Places in Chester County, Pennsylvania
Stone arch bridges in the United States